Konfrontacja Sztuk Walki (English: Martial Arts Confrontation) better known by its initials KSW, is  widely considered to be the premiere mixed martial arts organization in Poland and one of the leading in Europe.

History

Martin Lewandowski had been the manager of the Hotel Marriott in Warsaw when he met Maciej Kawulski in 2002. Kawulski was organizing one of the biggest sports expos in Poland at that time, and as both businessmen come from martial arts backgrounds, they quickly found a common subject. Eighteen months later the first KSW show was born.

The promotion is famed for its four and eight-man tournaments, which until KSW X - Dekalog took place over the period of one night, but since KSW XI they are split, with the tournament final taking place on the next event. KSW XV is the first event without a new tournament, only with extra fights and finals from previous tournaments.

Different from other bigger promotions such as the UFC, KSW adopted the strategy of having events that are less frequent but bigger, focusing on creating big shows with stacked cards and with great spectacle.  In 2017, KSW 39: Colosseum beat the record to largest live attendance to a MMA event in Europe, and second-largest in history with 57,776 fans, only after the Pride Shockwave in 2002 and ahead of UFC 193.

Several fighters who have been successful in KSW have signed on to more well known promotions such as the UFC. KSW has its own fight team, the KSW Team, which consists of some of the promotion's elite fighters, such as Mamed Khalidov, Jan Błachowicz, Krzysztof Kulak, Łukasz Jurkowski or Antoni Chmielewski. KSW co-operates with many other promotions in Europe by exchanging fighters, for example WFC and The Cage. KSW runs the majority of its shows live on a variety of TV networks (Polsat Sport, Polsat Sport Extra) throughout Europe. Since KSW XI, the promotion runs its shows live on nationally available at private free-to-air television network Polsat.

The KSW ring announcer is Waldemar Kasta, a former rapper born in Wrocław.

Roster

Rankings

The rankings for the KSW's fighters are both recorded and updated when information has been obtained from the KSW's website.

List of KSW events

List of KSW events: 
2004 in Konfrontacja Sztuk Walki  -  2005 in Konfrontacja Sztuk Walki  -  2006 in Konfrontacja Sztuk Walki  -  2007 in Konfrontacja Sztuk Walki  -  2008 in Konfrontacja Sztuk Walki  -  2009 in Konfrontacja Sztuk Walki  -  2010 in Konfrontacja Sztuk Walki  -  2011 in Konfrontacja Sztuk Walki  -  2012 in Konfrontacja Sztuk Walki  -  2013 in Konfrontacja Sztuk Walki  -  2014 in Konfrontacja Sztuk Walki  -  2015 in Konfrontacja Sztuk Walki  -  2016 in Konfrontacja Sztuk Walki  -  2017 in Konfrontacja Sztuk Walki  -  2018 in Konfrontacja Sztuk Walki  -  2019 in Konfrontacja Sztuk Walki

Current champions

Men's divisions

Women's divisions

Championship history

Heavyweight championship

Light heavyweight championship

Middleweight championship

Welterweight championship

Lightweight championship

Featherweight championship

Bantamweight championship

Women's flyweight championship

Women's strawweight championship

KSW fighters
List of current KSW fighters

Notable fighters

 Daniel Acácio
 Houston Alexander
 Scott Askham
 Roberto Soldić
 Jan Błachowicz
 Mateusz Gamrot
 Francis Carmont
 Jasminka Cive
 Brett Cooper
 Phil De Fries 
 Tomasz Drwal
 Damian Stasiak
 Yasubey Enomoto
 Eric Esch
 Maiquel Falcao
 Kalindra Faria
 Sheila Gaff
 Andrey Gerasimchuk
 Konstantin Gluhov
 Rodney Glunder
 Rolles Gracie Jr.
 Peter Graham
 Sergej Grecicho
 Kendall Grove
 Jason Guida
 Alexander Gustafsson
 Mike Hayes
 Matt Horwich
 James Irvin
 Satoshi Ishii
 Rafal Jackiewicz
 Damian Janikowski
 Maciej Jewtuszko
 Yusuke Kawaguchi
 Mamed Khalidov
 Szymon Kołecki
 Karolina Kowalkiewicz
 Matt Lindland
 Melvin Manhoef
 John Maguire
 Sean McCorkle
 James McSweeney
 Mario Miranda
 Christian M'Pumbu
 Tomasz Narkun
 Pawel Nastula
 Oleksiy Oliynyk
 Daniel Omielańczuk
 Wojciech Orłowski
 Valentijn Overeem
 Rousimar Palhares
 Norman Parke
 Łukasz Parobiec
 Igor Pokrajac
 Wagner Prado
 Mariusz Pudzianowski
 Paweł "Popek" Rak
 Goran Reljic
 Ryuta Sakurai
 Bob Sapp
 Przemysław Saleta
 Jay Silva
 Thiago Silva
 Paul Slowinski
 Peter Sobotta
 Rameau Thierry Sokoudjou
 Simona Soukupova
 Artur Szpilka
 Jesse Taylor
 Paulo Thiago
 James Thompson
 Oli Thompson
 Kazuki Tokudome
 Attila Végh
 Rodney Wallace
 Jim Wallhead
 Curt Warburton
 Andre Winner
 Arkadiusz Wrzosek
 Virgil Zwicker

References

External links
 Konfrontacja at Sherdog
 KSW Official Site
 European MMA Rankings

 
Organizations established in 2004
Mixed martial arts organizations
Sports organisations of Poland
Mixed martial arts events lists
2004 establishments in Poland